Landivisiau is a commune in the Finistère department of Brittany in north-western France. The journalist Luc Le Vaillant, winner of the 1998 Albert Londres Prize was born in Landivisiau. Landivisiau is twinned with Bideford in north Devon.

Geography

Climate 
Landivisiau has a oceanic climate (Köppen climate classification Cfb).

Landivisiau Naval Air Base
A squadron of 25× Air-Sol Moyenne Portée nuclear armed Rafale M from the French Navy is based at Landivisiau.

International relations
It is twinned with Bideford in the southwest of the United Kingdom and Bad Sooden-Allendorf in Hesse, Germany.

Population
Inhabitants of Landivisiau are called in French Landivisiens.

Breton language
In 2008, 7.11% of primary-school children attended bilingual schools, where Breton language is taught alongside French.

See also
Communes of the Finistère department
List of the works of Bastien and Henry Prigent
Maurice Le Scouëzec

References

External links

Official website 

Mayors of Finistère Association 

Communes of Finistère